La dame de chez Maxim's (The Girl from Maxim's) is a 1933 British French-language comedy film directed by Alexander Korda and starring Florelle, Esther Kiss and Ady Cresso. The film is a French-language version of the 1933 film The Girl from Maxim's made by London Film Productions. Both films were directed by Korda, and were based on the 1899 farce La Dame de chez Maxim by Georges Feydeau.

Cast
 Florelle - La Môme Crevette 
 Esther Kiss - Eléonore 
 Ady Cresso - Mme Virette 
 Jeanne Frédérique - La sous-préfète 
 Maryanne - Mme Vibaudan 
 Charlotte Lysès - Gabrielle Petypon - la femme de Lucien 
 André Lefaur - Le général Petypon du Grêlé 
 André Alerme - Le docteur Lucien Petypon 
 Pierre Palau - Le docteur Mongicourt 
 Maurice Rémy - Le lieutenant Corignon 
 Marcel Meral - Le duc 
 Henri Debain - Etienne 
 Marcel Maupi - Le sous-préfet
 Jean Delmour - Marollier 
 Félix Mayol - L'évêque 
 Madeleine Ozeray - Clémentine 
 Marguerite de Morlaye - La duchesse 
 Jane de Carol - Une invitée 
 Louis Pré Fils - Emile 
 Beauvais - Un maître d'hôtel

See also
 Maxim's

References

Bibliography
 Kulik, Karol. Alexander Korda: The Man Who Could Work Miracles. Virgin Books, 1990.

External links

1933 films
British comedy films
1930s French-language films
British films based on plays
Films based on works by Georges Feydeau
Films directed by Alexander Korda
Films set in Paris
1933 comedy films
Films produced by Alexander Korda
British multilingual films
British black-and-white films
1933 multilingual films
1930s British films